Subic Bay International Airport serves as a secondary and diversion airport for Ninoy Aquino International Airport in Metro Manila and Clark International Airport in Pampanga. It also serves the immediate area of the Subic Bay Freeport Zone, the provinces of Bataan and Zambales, and the general area of Olongapo in the Philippines.

The airport was known as the Naval Air Station Cubi Point, part of the Subic Naval Base of the United States Navy, before the base closed.

History

In 1950, Admiral Arthur W. Radford, Commander-in-Chief of the United States Pacific Fleet, envisioned a naval base in the Western Pacific to enhance Seventh Fleet capabilities. The Korean War began and the Navy realized it had a need for an air station in the region. Cubi Point in the Philippines was selected, and civilian contractors were initially approached for the project. After seeing the Zambales Mountains and the surrounding jungle, they claimed it could not be done.

The U.S. Navy then turned to the Seabees and was told this would not be a problem. The first Seabees to arrive were surveyors of Construction Battalion Detachment 1802. Mobile Construction Battalion 3 arrived on 2 October 1951 to get the project going and was joined by MCB 5 in November. Over the next five years, MCBs 2, 7, 9, 11 and CBD 1803 also contributed to the effort. They leveled a mountain to make way for a nearly  runway. NAS Cubi Point turned out to be one of the largest earth-moving projects in the world, equivalent to the construction of the Panama Canal. Seabees there moved  of dry fill plus another 15 million that was hydraulic fill.

The $100 million-facility (equivalent to $ million in ) was commissioned on 25 July 1956, and comprised an air station with an adjacent pier capable of docking the Navy's largest carriers. Despite this, the American government wished to keep the Subic Naval Base and signed a treaty with the Philippine government.

The treaty was not ratified, however, failing by a slim margin in the Philippine Senate. Attempts to negotiate a new treaty were soon abandoned and the United States was informed that it was to withdraw within one year. U.S. forces withdrew in November 1992, turning over the facility with its airport to the Philippine government.

Initially some 8,000 volunteers guarded the facility and prevented looters from damaging the facilities. The Subic Bay Metropolitan Authority (SBMA) was created to manage the facility by virtue of Republic Act No. 7227 after intense lobbying of then-Mayor Richard Gordon. He was appointed its first Chairman and Administrator.

Twenty days after the departure of American forces, the airport ushered in its first commercial flight from Taiwan via Makung.  In February 1993, NAS Cubi Point was converted to Cubi Point International Airport. To herald its designation as an international airport, President Fidel V. Ramos chose to arrive in November 1993 from an official visit to the United States using the airport.  This flight also proved the capabilities of the airport as the President arrived aboard the delivery flight of Philippine Airlines's first Boeing 747-400.

Construction of the present runway by Hanjin Heavy Industries and Construction Philippines began in 1993 and was completed in April 1995, in time for the inaugural landing of FedEx Express MD-11 and the formal opening of FedEx's AsiaOne hub.  The newly renamed Subic Bay International Airport was formally opened on 30 September 1996. The new 12.6-million passenger terminal built by Summa Kumagai Inc. (a joint Filipino-Japanese venture) was inaugurated on 4 November 1996, in time for the 4th APEC Leaders' Summit.

Between 1992 and 1995 SBIA welcomed a total of around 100,000 commercial passengers. The airport was expected to handle 110,000 passengers in 1996. In 1997, SBIA topped the 100,000 annual passenger count. For the year 1998, the airport handled a total of around 1,000 international and 6,000 domestic flights, and almost 100,000 inbound and outbound passengers. By 2007 the number of recorded passengers had dropped to 17,648, but due to the presence of the FedEx AsiaOne Hub the airport still handled 115,108 flights.

The FedEx hub lasted until February 2009, when all operations were moved to Guangzhou Baiyun International Airport in Guangzhou, China. Due to this departure, as well as the planned expansion of nearby Clark International Airport, Subic Bay Metropolitan Authority Administrator and CEO Armand C. Arreza expressed interest in closing Subic Bay International Airport in favor of converting the area to a logistics hub in January 2010.

In December 2010, Guam-based Aviation Concepts Inc. set up fixed-base operations at the airport, refurbishing a  hangar to international standards, with the aim of eventually establishing a full-service aviation center.

In 2016, the airport began to once again be used for daily commercial passenger flights, with Air Juan flying their nine-seater amphibious aircraft to and from their private seaplane base in Manila South Harbor, located north of the CCP Complex.

In 2018, Razon Group acquired Aviation Concepts Technical Services, Inc. (ACTSI) and signed a 25-year lease agreement (as well as a 25-year option) with the local government that will see the airport transformed into a regional business aviation hub, with a fifty plus years potential.  The company is refurbishing its  facility and targeting to its premiere upgrade in the third quarter of 2019.

In July 2021, the airport was used again for repatriation flights of Overseas Filipino Workers (OFW) which were facilitated by Philippine Airlines. The activity led to the revival of a commercial flight schedule for the first time since 2011 despite the COVID-19 pandemic. Repatriation flights to the airport ended on 22 February 2022 after capacity restrictions at Ninoy Aquino International Airport were eased.

Airlines and destinations

Cargo airlines
FedEx Express closed its hub at Subic Bay on 6 February 2009; this was the first hub to be closed in FedEx's history. The hub operation was relocated to Guangzhou Baiyun International Airport in China and while ground and technical operations were transferred to Clark International Airport in Clark Freeport Zone. FedEx's support company, Corporate Air, ceased all operations after the hub closure.

Flight training

 ACE Pilots Aviation Academy
 Aero Equipment Aviation Inc.
 Alpha Aviation Group
 APG International Aviation Academy
 Asian Institute Of Aviation
 First Aviation Academy Inc.
 Laminar Aviation, Inc.
 OMNI Aviation Corporation

The airport is also a base of a flight school Aeroflite Aviation Corp since 2006.

Events

Subic Bay International Airport hosted a number of wide-bodied aircraft during the seventh APEC Summit in 1996. They included a chartered Royal Brunei Airlines Airbus A340-200, Japanese Air Force One, and the Air Force One, among others.

Incidents and accidents
On October 18, 1999, FedEx Express Flight 87, a McDonnell Douglas MD-11F, suffered an accident. The plane was arriving from Shanghai Hongqiao International Airport; during the flight there was moderate turbulence and the crew failed to see an error in the airspeed. This meant that the plane landed at too high a speed. Upon landing at Subic Bay's runway 07, the plane continued on onto runway 25, hitting a concrete post and slamming into a wire fence before plunging into the bay. All of the plane was submerged except the cockpit. The crew were safe apart from minor injuries but the aircraft was no longer usable.

References

External links
SBMA official website: Subic Bay International Airport

Airports in the Philippines
Buildings and structures in Bataan
Olongapo
Transportation in Bataan
Transportation in Zambales
Tourism in Metro Manila
Transportation in Luzon
Subic Special Economic and Freeport Zone